The 1968 United States Senate election in Iowa took place on November 5, 1968. Incumbent Republican U.S. Senator Bourke B. Hickenlooper retired. The open seat was won by Democratic Governor Harold E. Hughes, narrowly defeating Republican State Representative David M. Stanley.

General election

Candidates
Verne Higens (Prohibition)
Harold E. Hughes, incumbent Governor of Iowa (Democratic)
David M. Stanley, State Representative from Muscatine (Republican)

Results

See also 
 1968 United States Senate elections

References

1968
Iowa
United States Senate